Calvin Kenneth Robertson (born June 10, 1986) is an American actor and cinematographer.  His most notable performance was that of teenage murderer Cal Gabriel in Zero Day, a film based on the Columbine High School massacre and perpetrators Eric Harris and Dylan Klebold. Robertson was cast in the role of Gabriel when director Ben Coccio scouted for actors in Connecticut. Robertson and co-star Andre Keuck shared Best Actor honors at the 2003 Slamdunk Film Festival. Robertson also had many roles in television series including The Sopranos to White Collar.

Career
27-year-old director Ben Coccio scouted the local high schools looking for two boys to play the roles of the killers in his move Zero Day. Coccio decided on Calvin Robertson for the lead role in the film, and then convinced Calvin's parents to allow Calvin to star in the movie. Robertson received a Best Actor award, Zero Day, Florida International Film Fest. The New York Times Elvis Mitchell reviewed Zero Day and said, "Mr. Robertson has the willowy blond good looks of a Gap model, and a sullen presence to match."

After his experience as an actor, Robertson pursued opportunities in movies and television. After some minor success, Robertson settled on work behind the camera. Robertson is now an aspiring filmmaker. He has eight films listed on his web site. In 2013 one of his short films (Dog Ghost) was showcased at NewFilmmakers Los Angeles. In 2015 he assisted Eddie Mullins on the film Doomsdays.

Filmography

Film

Television

Cinematographer and director

References

External links
 

1986 births
Living people
21st-century American male actors